Angostura may refer to:

Places

Mexico
 Angostura, Sinaloa, a city in north-west Mexico
 Angostura Municipality, Sinaloa, a municipality in Sinaloa, Mexico
 Puerto de la Angostura, Coahuila, site of the 1847 Battle of Buena Vista between American and Mexican forces

Venezuela
 Angostura, Venezuela, the former name of Ciudad Bolívar
 Angostura Municipality, Venezuela, a municipality in Bolivar State

Other places
 Angostura River, a river in Chile
 Angostura, Antioquia, a municipality in the Department of Antioquia, Colombia
 Angostura, South Dakota, a populated area in Fall River County, South Dakota, US
 Angostura, Sullana, a village in Sullana Province, Peru
 La Angostura (disambiguation)
 Villa La Angostura, a mountain town in Neuquén, Argentina

Other uses
 Angostura (plant), a genus in the family Rutaceae
 Angostura bark, a spice made from the bark of the tree Angostura trifoliata
 Angostura bitters, a flavoring
 Congress of Angostura, an 1819–1821 legislative body of Gran Colombia
 House of Angostura, a Trinidad and Tobago company manufacturing angostura bitters

See also
 Primera Angostura, a part of the Strait of Magellan, Chile
 Segunda Angostura, a part of the Strait of Magellan, Chile
 Angostura Guías, in Patagonia, Chile
 Angostura Inglesa, in Patagonia, Chile
 Angostura de Paine, a locale on Route 5 in both Santiago Metropolitan Region and O'Higgins Region of Chile
 Angostura Bridge, a bridge near Ciudad Bolívar, Venezuela
 Angostura Colorada Formation, a geological formation in Argentina
 Angostura Dam (disambiguation)
 Angostura Reservoir, South Dakota
 La Angostura (disambiguation)
 Angustura, Minas Gerais, Brazil
 Angustura, New Mexico, US